The Bellingham Herald is a daily newspaper published in Bellingham, Washington, in the United States. It was founded on March 10, 1890, as The Fairhaven Herald and changed its name after Bellingham was incorporated as a city in 1903. The Bellingham Herald is the largest newspaper in Whatcom County, with a weekday circulation of over 8,700. It employs around 60 people. It is owned by The McClatchy Company.

History

The Fairhaven Herald published its first edition on March 10, 1890, and was originally based in Fairhaven. The tri-weekly newspaper was one of several established in the Bellingham area in the late 19th century. The first editor, William "Lightfoot" Visscher, worked for the paper for 18 months before falling out with Nelson Bennet, the landowner. Visscher was fired in April 1891 and returned to his previous occupation in Tacoma. In 1900 the newspaper purchased the first linotype on the West Coast. In 1903, owner Sidney Albert Perkins merged the newspaper with a competitor and renamed it The Bellingham Herald. 

The Herald fended off competition from the Puget Sound American, which had been established in 1904 by Seattle Times publisher Joseph Blethen. The American had merged with another existing daily, the Reveille, but was unable to overtake The Herald in circulation. The Reveille was acquired by The Herald in 1927.

The newspaper moved its offices to the newly-constructed Herald Building in 1926. Federated Publications bought The Herald from Sam Perkins in 1967 and merged with the Gannett Corporation in 1971. The Herald switched to morning delivery in May 1997 and launched its website on February 15, 2000. Knight-Ridder acquired The Bellingham Herald in 2005. Knight-Ridder was acquired by McClatchy in 2006, putting The Herald under their ownership.

Herald building
The Herald building is located in downtown Bellingham at the corner of State Street and Chestnut Street. Built in 1926, the six-story Gothic Revival building uses white terra cotta tiles and stained glass windows depicting a herald playing his trumpet. The building was the first in downtown Bellingham to use a concrete-and-steel form and steam for heating.

The newspaper's main offices were located on the second floor, while tenant businesses occupied the remaining space, including a dentist, a restaurant, and the local chamber of commerce. Prior to the construction of the Bellingham Towers in 1930, the Herald Building was the tallest in the city. It is listed on the National Register of Historic Places, as well as the State Historic Register. The employee offices were relocated to the Barkley Village area in 2019 after the newsroom was downsized.

Herald sign
The Herald rooftop sign, standing 40'x10', is managed by Kane Hall of Daylight Properties. Morse Hardware had a similar sign for decades - and boaters would use the two illuminated signs at night for navigation. The original sign was lit by more than 300 incandescent bulbs before changing to neon four years later. In 2016, Daylight Properties installed modern aluminum lights, "creating a programmable LED lighting system that shows a variety of colors beyond the traditional neon red". The colors change to a bright red and green for the holiday season and can display multiple colors in accord with local festivals and holidays.

Subscription
The Bellingham Herald produces newspaper articles in print and digital form. The newspaper is printed alongside the Skagit Valley Herald in Skagit County and distributed to businesses, homes, and newspaper boxes in Whatcom County, excluding Point Roberts. The newspaper ended its Saturday print edition in 2019.

References

External links

The McClatchy Company's subsidiary profile of The Bellingham Herald

Newspapers published in Washington (state)
McClatchy publications
Mass media in Bellingham, Washington
Newspapers established in 1890
1890 establishments in Washington (state)